Campolaemus is a genus of very small, air-breathing land snails, terrestrial pulmonate gastropod mollusks in the family Streptaxidae.

Species
The genus Campolaemus includes the following species:
 Campolaemus perexilis Smith, 1892, the type species

References

 Bank, R. A. (2017). Classification of the Recent terrestrial Gastropoda of the World. Last update: July 16th, 2017
 Páll-Gergely, B. (2020). Campolaemus Pilsbry, 1892 is not a hypselostomatid, but a streptaxid (Gastropoda: Eupulmonata). Ruthenica. 30 (1): 69–71.

External links
 https://biodiversitylibrary.org/page/12596903

Streptaxidae
Taxa named by Henry Augustus Pilsbry
Gastropod genera
Taxonomy articles created by Polbot